is a manga created by Naoko Takeuchi. The series revolves around the character Minako Aino, a cheerful schoolgirl who finds out that she has magical powers that she must use to protect the people of the Earth. Codename: Sailor V is the basis for its sequel, Pretty Soldier Sailor Moon.

Plot
Minako Aino is a 13-year-old young middle school student who is slightly distracted, out-spoken and dreams about someday finding her true love and boyfriend. One day, she encounters a talking white cat with a crescent moon on its forehead named Artemis. He reveals that Minako possesses the magical ability to transform into a much stronger, more powerful, and more beautiful girl than anyone.

He calls her "Sailor Venus" and tells her she has a mission to protect Earth in the name of her guardian planet Venus. To help her with her new mission, Artemis gives her two items, a crescent moon shaped compact and a magical pen. The magical pen allows her to transform into the Soldier of Justice: Sailor V.

Minako begins fighting the evil agents known as the Dark Agency, who fight under Danburite's command. He is in charge of sending his many talented idols to enslave the public.

Minako has many adventures as a Soldier of Justice, some sparking the envy and admiration of the police force. She also later gains the aid of Saijyo Ace, who had for a moment taken her spotlight due to his popular TV show.

Eventually, Minako realizes that her duty is more important than romance and discovers her true identity as Sailor Venus. From there, she decides to search for the other four Sailor Guardians and the Moon princess.

Release
Codename: Sailor V made its debut as a one-shot in the summer vacation issue of the manga magazine RunRun, published on August 3, 1991. It returned as a serial in RunRun, which lasted until July 3, 1997. Kodansha compiled the fifteen chapters into three Tankōbon or "Bound Volumes" and published them from December 18, 1993 to November 6, 1997. In 2004, the series was re-released in Japan as a two-volume Shinsōban or "Deluxe Edition" with revised artwork and dialogue. This release also saw the final, fifteenth, chapter split into two giving this release sixteen chapters total. The two volumes were released on October 28, 2004 and November 20, 2004. On May 27, 2014 Codename: Sailor V was published in a two-volume Kanzenban or "Complete Edition". This has a premium release with A5 sized paper and has new covers based on the covers of the original release. On February 28, 2019, Codename: Sailor V was published in a two-volume Bunkoban or "Takeuchi Naoko Bunko Collection" edition of the manga which is a smaller version of the Kanzenban with similar covers.

An OVA series was teased in promotional materials, but never came to fruition, the Sailor Moon anime being created instead.

In North America, the original Japanese release was never officially localized into English. Kodansha USA licensed the "Deluxe Edition" of Codename: Sailor V for an English-language release, alongside its re-printing of the Sailor Moon manga. The two volumes released on September 13, 2011 and November 15, 2011. On March 18, 2020, Kodansha USA announced Codename: Sailor V Eternal Edition that features new cover art, a new translation, and color pages from the original serialization. It is an English-language release of the Japanese "Complete Edition." Both volumes were scheduled for release on January 5, 2021, but they were delayed with the first volume releasing September 28, 2021 and the second on November 9, 2021.

The series has also been translated into other languages, including Indonesian by Elex Media Komputindo, French and Spanish by Glenat; German by Egmont Manga & Anime; Italian by Star Edizioni and later by GP Publishing, serialized in its manga magazine Amici; and Polish by JPF.

Chapters

Tankōbon editions

Shinsōban editions

Kanzenban editions

Reception
For the week of 11 September 2011 to 17 September 2011, Codename: Sailor V was second on The New York Times Manga Best Sellers list, behind the first volume of Sailor Moon.  The following week, it was again second on the list behind the first volume of Sailor Moon.  The week after that, it slipped to third place.  For the week of 9 October - 15 October, it reappeared at eighth place, the next week appearing at ninth.  For the week of 6–12 November 2011, the first volume appeared at #2 on the list, above Sailor Moon for the first time.  The following week, the second volume of Codename: Sailor V appeared at #2 on the list, and the first volume did not appear.  For the week of 20–26 November, the second volume placed third on the list.  On the BookScan Top 20 Graphic Novels of November 2011, the second volume placed third, and the first volume placed thirteenth.

Brigid Alverson of MTV Geek described Codename: Sailor V as feeling like a rough draft of Sailor Moon. Ed Sizemore felt from Comics Worth Reading Sailor V had less character development than Sailor Moon, feeling that this was not a drawback. Sean Gaffney of Manga Bookshelf notes that unlike Usagi, Minako performs her missions alone, and describes the tone of the manga as an " action comedy". Writing for Anime News Network, Rebecca Silverman noted that most of Sailor V is episodic, but feels it is worth reading due to the insights it gives into Minako's character, and the groundwork it lays for Sailor Moon. Katherine Dacey wrote for Manga Critic that while an adult may see the series as "repetitive, hokey, and poorly drawn", a child would see it as an "appealing fantasy in which an ordinary girl can assume a new, powerful identity" to defeat bullies and evil. Dacey sees Codename Sailor V's strength as being Minako's enthusiastic character. The Fandom Post's Matthew Warner saw the book as being a "lighthearted spoof" of magical girl titles.

References

External links
 Code Name: Sailor V - a novelization of the manga at The Manga of Takeuchi Naoko

1991 manga
1997 comics endings
Japanese idols in anime and manga
Kodansha manga
Magical girl anime and manga
Manga series
Romance anime and manga
Sailor Moon
Shōjo manga